Serdar Deniz (born 26 June 1997) is a Turkish alpine skier. He competed in the 2018 Winter Olympics.

References

1997 births
Living people
Alpine skiers at the 2018 Winter Olympics
Turkish male alpine skiers
Olympic alpine skiers of Turkey
21st-century Turkish people